The Asian Studies Center is The Heritage Foundation's oldest research center. It was established in 1983 in recognition of the dynamic Asia-Pacific region’s growing importance to U.S. interests. Today, the Center is internationally recognized as one of the world’s preeminent policy think tanks working on Asian issues. Its Scholars consistently advocate policies that promote liberty and democracy, economic freedom, the rule of law, and a robust system of security alliances.  Highlights include hosting the annual B.C. Lee Lecture, which has featured remarks by such notables as Henry Kissinger and Condoleezza Rice; Key Asian Indicators: A 2009 Book of Charts which provides a snapshot in time of how countries in the region fare economically and more. The Asian Studies Center is heavily engaged with the Asian-Pacific press corps in Washington, D.C., through its one-of-a-kind Washington Roundtable for the Asia Pacific Press.(WRAPP)

B.C. Lee Lecture 
These lectures focus on U.S. Relations with the Asia-Pacific region. They are funded by an endowment from the Samsung group in honor of the late B.C. Lee, the corporation's founder.

The Washington Roundtable for the Asia-Pacific Press (WRAPP) 
The Washington Roundtable for the Asia-Pacific Press (WRAPP) is the largest organization of Asian media in the United States. It is currently affiliated with The Heritage Foundation's Asian Studies Center. WRAPP's purpose is to provide Asian journalists greater access to "Inside the Beltway" policy-makers.

Since its inception in 1994, WRAPP has sponsored monthly news briefings tailored to the needs of Asian journalists. Roundtable sessions have included speakers such as Rep. Benjamin Gilman (R-NY), Chairman of the House International Relations Committee, Rep. Doug Bereuter (R-NB), Chairman of the House Asia-Pacific Subcommittee, and Deputy Assistant Secretary of Defense Dr. Kurt Campbell. Personalities such as Washington Post syndicated columnist David Broder have also been featured in the Roundtable's "on-the-record" briefings.

WRAPP membership includes nearly all Washington correspondents from Japan, Taiwan, Korea, China, and other countries in the region. Also among the Roundtable's 400 members are U.S.-based print and broadcast media - as well as international wire services and news agencies whose Washington bureaus cover Asia-Pacific diplomacy, trade, and security

External links 

Asian Studies Center
Organizations established in 1983
Asian studies
United States–Asian relations
Conservative organizations in the United States